"Right on the Tip of My Tongue" is a song written by Van McCoy and Joe Cobb and performed by Brenda & the Tabulations.  It reached #10 on the U.S. R&B chart and #23 on the U.S. pop chart in 1971.

The song was arranged by Van McCoy and produced by McCoy and Gilda Woods.

This song is noted for Brenda's spoken recitation in the Coda section, which leads to the song's surprising end.

The song ranked #97 on Billboard magazine's Top 100 singles of 1971.

Chart history

Weekly charts

Year-end charts

References

External links
 Lyrics of this song
 

1971 songs
1971 singles
Songs written by Van McCoy